Mulu were a British trip hop duo of the late 1990s, who released one album, Smiles Like a Shark, on 4 August 1997.  The duo consisted of singer Laura Campbell, and producer Alan Edmunds, who had worked as a remixer for Utah Saints, Fluke, Björk, Heaven 17, Elbow, The Kills, Moloko, Mellow, Spandau Ballet, OMD, and Dame Shirley Bassey.

The album spawned three singles; "Filmstar", "Pussycat" and "Desire".  "Pussycat" was named Record of the Week on Mark and Lard's BBC Radio One show, and reached #50 in the UK Singles Chart.

References

Trip hop groups
British electronic music groups
Dedicated Records artists